Puerto María Manteca is a settlement in Mirití-Paraná Municipality, Amazonas Department Department in Colombia.

Climate
Puerto María Manteca has a tropical rainforest climate (Af) with heavy to very heavy rainfall year-round.

References

Populated places in the Amazonas Department